KLGU-LP (106.1 FM) was a radio station licensed to Logan, Utah, United States. The station was owned by the City of Logan.

The station's license expired on October 1, 2005, and was terminated by the FCC on May 10, 2011.

References

External links
 

LGU-LP
LGU-LP
Defunct radio stations in the United States
2011 disestablishments in Utah
Radio stations disestablished in 2011
LGU-LP